Brownhill Creek Recreation Park is a protected area located about  south  of the Adelaide city centre in City of Mitcham along part of the course of the Brown Hill Creek.  The recreation park was proclaimed under the National Parks and Wildlife Act 1972 in 1972 to "provide recreation opportunities for the Adelaide and eastern metropolitan region and to conserve remnant aged river red gums and the riparian zone habitat".  The land previously subject to protected area status as a "National Pleasure Resort" since 1915.  The recreation park is classified as an IUCN Category III protected area.

See also
 List of protected areas in Adelaide

References

External links
Brownhill Creek Recreation Park webpage on the Protected Planet website

Recreation Parks of South Australia
Protected areas in Adelaide
Protected areas established in 1915
1915 establishments in Australia